Carl Broemel (born January 30, 1974) is an American rock musician. He currently plays guitar, pedal steel guitar, saxophone and sings back-up vocals for the Louisville, Kentucky band My Morning Jacket. He played guitar in the pop/rock band Old Pike  and in the alternative pop/rock band Silvercrush.

History
Broemel grew up on the northside of Indianapolis, Indiana. The son of a symphony musician, he attended school and graduated from Pike High School.

In 2007 Broemel was listed among Rolling Stone's "20 New Guitar Gods" along with My Morning Jacket frontman Jim James. He has also released two solo albums. In 2010, he released his "Nashville" record All Birds Say. On October 11, 2010, Broemel played as a sit in guitarist with The Roots on Late Night with Jimmy Fallon. In December 2010 Broemel contributed to Wanda Jackson's album The Party Ain't Over.

In 2019, Broemel accompanied Ray LaMontagne during LaMontagne's Just Passing Through Tour. Broemel played guitar, pedal steel guitar, and sang back-up vocals on the November 9 and 10, 2019 tour dates in Denver, Colorado.

Equipment
 Duesenberg Starplayer TV (black with gold pickguard)

Discography

Solo albums
 Lose What's Left (2004)
 All Birds Say (2010)
 4th of July (2016)
 Wished Out (2018)
 Brokenhearted Jubilee (2019) (EP, with Eric Hopper)

With My Morning Jacket
 Z (2005)
 Evil Urges (2008)
Circuital (2011)
 The Waterfall (2015)
The Waterfall II (2020)
My Morning Jacket (2021)

References

External links
 
 My Space Page
 Twitter Page
 

1974 births
Living people
Musicians from Indianapolis
American male guitarists
American rock guitarists
ATO Records artists
My Morning Jacket members
20th-century American guitarists